Elisabeth Kleinert-Neumann was a German film editor active from the 1930s through the 1960s.

Selected filmography 

 Operazione San Pietro (1967)
 The Spy with Ten Faces (1966)
 Hotel der toten Gäste (1965)
 Die lustigen Weiber von Tirol (1964)
 Holiday in St. Tropez (1964)
 ...denn die Musik und die Liebe in Tirol (1963) 
 Eleven Years and One Day (1963)
 Street of Temptation (1962)
 Auf Wiedersehen (1961) 
 Brandenburg Division (1960)
 Nick Knatterton’s Adventure (1959)
 The Blue Sea and You (1959) 
 Tausend Sterne leuchten (1959)
 The Beggar Student (1956) 
 Roses in Autumn (1955)
 Regina Amstetten (1954)
 Moselfahrt aus Liebeskummer (1953)
 Liebeskrieg nach Noten (1953)
 Rape on the Moor (1952) 
 Bis wir uns wiedersehn (1952) 
 Tausend rote Rosen blüh'n (1952)
 Danke, es geht mir gut (1948) 
 Die schwarze Robe (1944) 
 Der Fall Rainer (1942) 
 Detours to Happiness (1939)
 The Voice of the Heart (1937)

References

External links 

 

German women film editors
German film editors